Lalitpur Junction railway station is an important railway station in Lalitpur district, Uttar Pradesh, India. Its code is LAR. It serves Lalitpur city and towns such as Chanderi in nearby Madhya Pradesh. The station consists of three platforms. The platforms are not well sheltered. The station was connected with Tikamgarh in 2013and further to Khajuraho by 2016.

Trains 

 Ujjaini Express
 Malwa Express
 Punjab Mail
 Bhopal–Lucknow Express
 Jabalpur–Jammu Tawi Express
 Gondwana Express
 Patalkot Express
 Shatabdi Express
 Sachkhand Express
 Delhi–Pathankot Superfast Express
 Pushpak Express
 Kushinagar Express
 Hazrat Nizamuddin–Jabalpur Express
 Jabalpur–H.Nizamuddin Express
 Gorakhpur–Secunderabad Express
 Gorakhpur–Yesvantpur Express
 Raptisagar Express
 Raptisagar Express
 Tulsi Express
 Kalinga Utkal Express
 Lokmanya Tilak Terminus–Lucknow Junction Superfast Express
 Bhopal–Pratapgarh Express
 Indore–Patna Express
 Hirakud Express
 Dakshin Express
 Sabarmati Express
 Samata Express
 Chhattisgarh Express
 Panchvalley Passenger
 Habibganj–New Delhi Shatabdi Express
 Jhelum Express
 Dr. Ambedkar Nagar–Prayagraj Express
 Bhopal–Khajuraho Mahamana Superfast Express

References

Railway stations in Uttar Pradesh
Jhansi railway division
Lalitpur, India